Paramelisa is a genus of moths in the family Erebidae.

Species
 Paramelisa dollmani Hampson, 1920
 Paramelisa leroyi Kiriakoff, 1953
 Paramelisa lophura Aurivillius, 1905
 Paramelisa lophuroides Oberthür, 1911

Former species
 Paramelisa bitjeana Bethune-Baker, 1927

References

Natural History Museum Lepidoptera generic names catalog

Syntomini
Moth genera